Minuscule 21 (in the Gregory-Aland numbering), ε 286 (Soden) is a Greek minuscule manuscript of the New Testament. It is written on parchment. Palaeographically it has been assigned to the 12th century. According to Scrivener it was written in the 10th century. It has marginalia and liturgical books.

Description 

The codex contains the text of the four Gospels with some lacunae (Mark 13:28-14:33; Luke 1:10-58; 21:26-22:50) on 203 parchment leaves. The text is written in two columns per page (size of column 16.3 by 4.6 cm), in black ink. The initial letters are in red or blue ink.

There is also another division according to the smaller Ammonian Sections (in Mark 237, the last numbered section in 16:15), but there are no references to the Eusebian Canons.

It contains  (lessons), and pictures. Liturgical books with hagiographies, Synaxaria and Menologion were added by later hand in the 15th century on the paper.

The text of John 5:4 is marked with an obelus; the text of the pericope John 7:53-8:11 is omitted.

Text 
The Greek text of the codex is mixed. It contains some the Western and the Caesarean elements, but the Byzantine element is predominate. Aland placed it in Category V. 
According to the Claremont Profile Method it represents textual family Kx in Luke 1, Luke 10, and Luke 20.

In Matthew 27:9 it has variant  (fulfilled what was spoken by Isaiah the prophet). This variant is supported only by Latin Codex Rehdigeranus. Another manuscripts contain "Jeremiah" or omit the name of the prophet.

History 

The manuscript probably was written in Calabria. At the end of Luke it is written  (the Lord save me, a sinner Onesimus). Probably it was written by Onesimus.

It is dated by the INTF to the 12th century.

It was partially collated by Scholz (1794-1852). It was examined and described by Paulin Martin. C. R. Gregory saw the manuscript in 1885.

It was held in Fontainebleau.

It is currently housed at the Bibliothèque nationale de France (Gr. 68) at Paris.

See also 

 List of New Testament minuscules
 Textual criticism
 Biblical manuscript

References

Further reading

External links 
 Robert Waltz, Minuscule 21 at the Encyclopedia of Textual Criticism (2007)
 Online images of minuscule 21 (Digital Microfilm) at the National Library of France.
 Online images of minuscule 21 (Digital Microfilm) at the CSNTM.

Greek New Testament minuscules
12th-century biblical manuscripts
Bibliothèque nationale de France collections